The 15767 / 68 Siliguri Junction - Alipurduar Junction Intercity Express is an Express train belonging to Indian Railways Northeast Frontier Railway zone that runs between  and  in India.

Coaches
The 15767 / 68 Siliguri Junction - Alipurduar Junction Intercity Express has nine general unreserved & two SLR (seating with luggage rake) coaches. It does not carry a pantry car coach.

As is customary with most train services in India, coach composition may be amended at the discretion of Indian Railways depending on demand.

Service

Routing
The 15767 / 68 Siliguri Junction - Alipurduar Junction Intercity Express runs from 
  via 
 
 Sevoke
 Bagrakote
 Odlabari
 Damdim
 New Malbazar 
 Chalsa
 Nagrakata
 
 Banarhat
 Binnaguri
 Dalgaon
 Madarihat
 Hasimara
 Hamiltonganj
 Kalchini
 Rajabhatkhawa to 
  in West Bengal.

Traction
As the route is going to electrification, a  based WDM-3D diesel locomotive pulls the train to its destination.

Incidents
On 2002 February 8, Siliguri–Alipurduar Intercity Express train killed one female elephant and injured two tuskers at Chapramari Wildlife Sanctuary between Malbazar and Nagrakata.

References

External links
15767 Intercity Express at India Rail Info
15768 Intercity Express at India Rail Info

Transport in Siliguri
Intercity Express (Indian Railways) trains
Rail transport in West Bengal
Transport in Alipurduar
Alipurduar railway division